Frederick Ramon de Bertodano y Wilson, 8th Marquis de Moral(1871–1955) was an Australian born officer in the British Army during the Second Matabele War and the Second Anglo-Boer War. In his capacity as "Intelligence Officer for Pretoria and the Northern Districts," Captain de Bertodano was instrumental in the investigation that resulted in the Court-martial of Breaker Morant.

References

1871 births
1955 deaths
Australian people of Spanish descent
Australian military personnel of the Second Boer War
Australian anti-communists
British spies during the Second Anglo-Boer War